"If Walls Could Talk" is a song by Celine Dion, which was intended as the final single from her greatest hits album All the Way... A Decade of Song. It was written and produced by Robert John "Mutt" Lange.  His then wife, Shania Twain, sang backing vocals on this track, and was programmed by Richard Meyer aka Swayd.

Background
First, in January 2000, there were rumors that "If Walls Could Talk" would be Dion's next single in the United Kingdom. But two months later, Sony Music UK released "The First Time Ever I Saw Your Face" instead. In April 2000, the cover of the single and the track list became available. "If Walls Could Talk" was supposed to be released on 5 May 2000 in Mexico, but it was cancelled. They preferred to release "I Want You to Need Me." Again, in October Sony decided to release the single in Europe, Australia, Japan and Central America in December 2000. But the release was cancelled for the third time. With that, the promotion of All the Way... A Decade of Song had ended.

"If Walls Could Talk" music video, directed by Liz Friedlander in 2000, was released on the 2001 All the Way... A Decade of Song & Video DVD compilation.

Critical reception
Michael Paoletta from Billboard highlighted this song. Stephen Thomas Erlewine claimed the song worked well as a "pretty" ballad.

Formats and track listings
Australian cancelled CD single
"If Walls Could Talk" – 5:19
"Then You Look at Me" – 4:09
"Un garçon pas comme les autres (Ziggy)" (Live) – 3:19

European/Japanese cancelled CD single
"If Walls Could Talk" – 5:19
"If Walls Could Talk" (Radio Edit) – 4:34
"To Love You More" – 5:28

References

External links

2000 singles
Celine Dion songs
Music videos directed by Liz Friedlander
Pop ballads
Song recordings produced by Robert John "Mutt" Lange
Songs written by Robert John "Mutt" Lange
1999 songs
Columbia Records singles
1990s ballads